Eduardo Caballero Calderón (6 March 1910 – 3 April 1993) was a Colombian journalist and writer. As a journalist, he worked for the main Colombian newspapers, including El Tiempo and El Espectador.  Also he was a diplomat from Colombia in Peru, Argentina, Spain and France.  Caballero was elected as congressman two times for the department of Boyacá and was mayor of Tipacoque.

Cabellero Calderón began writing in the 1940s and rose to prominence in the 1950s and 1960s. His most known books are El Cristo de espaldas (Backwards Christ) (1952), Siervo sin tierra (Landless Servant) (1954), La penúltima hora (The Hour Before the Last) (1955), and Manuel Pacho (1962), which are mainly depictions of events related to the bipartisan violence in Colombia (La Violencia).  Other works are Cain (1969), El buen salvaje (The Good Savage) (1963), a book that won the Nadal Prize in 1965 and Historia de dos Hermanos (Two Brothers' History) (1977) among others.

Although Caballero is one of the most recognized Colombian writers, his writing is mainly focused on essays, as shown in the next fragment extracted from his short story "Tale of Little Princess Isabel" written for the teaching of history to children:

Works
 ¿Por qué mató el zapatero? (1941)
 El arte de vivir sin soñar (1943)
 Suramérica tierra del hombre (1944)
 El nuevo príncipe (1945)
 Ancha es Castilla (1950)
 El Cristo de espaldas (1952)
 Siervo sin tierra (1954)
 La penúltima hora (1955)
 Manuel Pacho (1962)
 Memorias infantiles (1964)
 El buen salvaje (1963), novela con la que obtuvo el Premio Nadal en 1965
 Caín (1969)
 Azote de sapo (1975)
 Historia de dos Hermanos (1977)
 Hablamientos y pensadurías (1979)
 Tipacoque de ayer a hoy (1979)
 La historia en cuentos: El Almirante niño, El Rey de Roma, El Caballito de Bolívar.

See also
Literature of Colombia

References 

 http://www.biografiasyvidas.com/biografia/c/caballero_calderon.htm

Further reading

1910 births
1993 deaths
People from Bogotá
Colombian male writers
Colombian journalists
Male journalists
Permanent Delegates of Colombia to UNESCO
20th-century journalists